Clube Ferroviário do Recife, commonly known as Ferroviário do Recife, is a Brazilian football club based in Recife, Pernambuco state. They competed in the Série B twice.

History
The club was founded on March 17, 1928. They competed in the Série B in 1971, when they were eliminated n the First Stage, and in 1972, when they were again eliminated in the First Stage of the competition.

Stadium
Clube Ferroviário do Recife play their home games at Estádio Jefferson de Freitas, nicknamed Jaboatão. The stadium has a maximum capacity of 5,000 people.

References

Association football clubs established in 1928
Football clubs in Pernambuco
1928 establishments in Brazil